is a private university in Okayama, Okayama, Japan. The school first opened as Chugoku Junior College in 1962 and became a four-year college in 2002.

External links
 Official website 

Educational institutions established in 2002
Private universities and colleges in Japan
Okayama
Universities and colleges in Okayama Prefecture
2002 establishments in Japan